"Heaven" is a song by English electronic music band Depeche Mode, released as the lead single from their thirteenth studio album, Delta Machine (2013). Written by Martin Gore and produced by Ben Hillier, the song was world-premiered on KROQ's morning show Kevin and Bean on 30 January 2013. The single was released digitally in most territories on 31 January 2013, and physically on 1 February.

In the United Kingdom, "Heaven" was released digitally on 17 March 2013 and physically the following day. The B-side "All That's Mine" was written by Dave Gahan and Kurt Uenala. An accompanying music video for "Heaven" was directed by Timothy Saccenti and premiered on VEVO on 1 February 2013.

In June 2013, the single was certified gold by the Federazione Industria Musicale Italiana (FIMI), denoting downloads exceeding 15,000 units in Italy. In the UK, by contrast, the single reached #60, the first initial single from a Depeche Mode album to fail to reach the UK Top 40.

Background and Composition 
According to Martin Gore in an interview "'Heaven' was written on a piano. I had all the chords, and everything all worked out on the piano and the whole vocal melody, and the lyrics worked out before I went anywhere near a computer." Additionally, Andy Fletcher also says that the demo wasn't too different to the final and "Pretty much, apart from Dave's voice instead of Martin's voice, the actual finished song is pretty similar [to the demo]."

Dave Gahan has expressed his appreciation to the song in the same interview, expressing. "Of all the incredible songs that Martin has written over the years that I have been lucky enough to sing and perform, once in a while a song comes along - hopefully I'll write one of those myself one day - that's something I have to sing. It's something I want to sing." He further states. "To me, 'Heaven' is one of the reasons why I still make music."

Music video
The music video for "Heaven" was directed by Timothy Saccenti and filmed in November 2012 at the Marigny Opera House, a former Catholic church in New Orleans's Faubourg Marigny. Previously, Saccenti had directed the "In-Studio Collage 2012" video for "Angel" that premiered at the band's press conference in Paris on 23 October 2012.

The video's look was inspired by Terrence Malick's 2011 film The Tree of Life, with its beautiful yet twisted, dark imagery. "Mainly it's a performance video, which we haven't done in a long time", Gahan stated. The video debuted on VEVO on 1 February 2013.

Formats and track listings

 CD and iTunes singleCD maxi single and iTunes EP  Limited 12" single

This is the first Depeche Mode single since The Meaning of Love (Little 15 was an exception, a single released in UK as import), that the label of the singles doesn't have the BONG and the number, the first single to have this was Leave in Silence (BONG1), and the last single was the Personal Jesus 2011 (BONG43).

Credits and personnel
Credits adapted from CD single liner notes.

 Christoffer Berg – programming
 Anton Corbijn – design, photography
 Flood – mixing
 Ben Hillier – production
 Rob Kirwan – mix engineering
 Ferg Peterkin – engineering
 Bunt Stafford-Clark – mastering
 Kurt Uenala – additional programming, vocal recording

Charts

Weekly charts

Year-end charts

Release history

See also
 List of number-one dance singles of 2013 (U.S.)

References

External links
 Single information from the official Depeche Mode web site
 Allmusic review 

2013 singles
2013 songs
Columbia Records singles
Depeche Mode songs
Number-one singles in Hungary
British soft rock songs
Song recordings produced by Ben Hillier
Songs written by Martin Gore